The De La Salle University Lady Spikers  is the official women's volleyball team of De La Salle University.

History
The Lady Spikers were the first NCAA women's champions in volleyball when the tournament was introduced in NCAA Season 51 (1975–76). The first UAAP title of the team came in Season 62 (2000). They then won the UAAP title in 2004, 2005, 2006 (as 3-peat champions), 2009, 2011, 2012, 2013 (as 3-peat champions), and 2016, 2017, 2018 (as 3-peat champions). They have won a total of eleven (11) titles. The Lady Spikers hold the distinction of having appeared in the Finals for ten consecutive times from UAAP Seasons 71 to 80 (2009–2018) which is the longest streak in the Final Four era of the UAAP.

The Lady Spikers are also 4-peat Champions of the PVF National Inter-Collegiate Volleyball Tournament nailing the 8th, 9th, 10th & 11th editions of the tournament. They have also won three successive Shakey's V-League titles – Second Conference of Season 1 in 2004, First Conference of Season 2 in 2005, and First Conference of Season 3 in 2006.

In 2009 the Lady Spikers soared high as they emerged champions in the UAAP, overpowering the 2007 champions, FEU. 2009 Lady Spikers' captain, Manilla Santos was the MVP.

In 2010–2011, the Lady Spikers, powered by stalwarts Abigail Maraño, Michele Gumabao, Charleen Cruz (team captain), Stephanie Mercado and Season MVP Jacqueline Alarca, edged out the UST Tigresses in Game 2 of the Season 73 Finals. Cruz was the Finals MVP.

In 2011–2012, the Lady Spikers swept the elimination round to earn an automatic finals berth and a 1-game advantage in the Finals. After losing their first game in the season in Game 1, the Lady Spikers led by Season MVP Maraño, Gumabao and prized rookies Mika Reyes and Ara Galang defeated the Ateneo Lady Eagles in Games 2 and 3 (winning Game 3 against the Ateneo Lady Eagles in 3 straight sets). Graduating team captain Charleen Cruz was hailed the Most Valuable player of the Finals for the second straight year (Season 73 and 74).

In 2012–2013, after an opening day loss to the UST Golden Tigresses, the Lady Spikers won the rest of their elimination round games to finish with a 13–1 win-loss card. In the Final Four, the Lady Spikers defeated the NU Lady Bulldogs in 3 straight sets to advance to the finals facing rival Ateneo Lady Eagles.  In Game 1 of the best of 3 Finals, the Lady Eagles started strong and led 2–0 but the Lady Spikers regained their bearings and came back to win the last 3 sets and win Game 1 despite committing 48 unforced errors.  In Game 2, the Lady Spikers, with the leadership of Season MVP and best blocker Aby Maraño together with co-MVP Ara Galang, Mika Reyes, Michele Gumabao, Melissa Gohing, Wensh Tiu, Mika Esperenza, Kim Fajardo and Cyd Demecillo, once again crushed the Ateneo Lady Eagles, handing them their 13th straight loss against the mighty Lady Spikers, 3 sets to none, giving La Salle its eighth UAAP championship and its second 3-peat feat.  Gumabao was chosen as Finals MVP.

In the 2013–2014 season, with the goal of capturing a 4-peat title and their 9th UAAP championship in mind, La Salle made a remarkable second 14–0 win-loss eliminations record, making them the first women's volleyball team to achieve the feat, and once again showed no mercy to Ateneo, winning the elimination games against the Katipunan-based female squad. DLSU then got the number 1 spot after defeating every team on its way. The Lady Spikers got the thrice-to-beat advantage, establishing the longest winning streak in UAAP history (standing at 30 games, since its second game during the Season 75 eliminations round, up to the final eliminations game in Season 76). DLSU, however, lost to their nemesis Ateneo (in their third consecutive season matchup for the championship) 3 games to 1 (despite La Salle's 1–0 incentive lead for the tournament's best-of-five championship round), giving the Lady Eagles their first title ever since they joined the UAAP, ending 36 years of drought. The UAAP Season 76 women's volleyball finals series is notable for being the longest championship series in the league's history (lasting 5 games after the Ateneo Lady Eagles overcame La Salle's thrice-to-beat advantage in the 5-set thriller Game 3), with La Salle being the first ever UAAP varsity team to gain an automatic finals berth as top seed but losing to a lower-seed team in the championship series in the 2008 to the present form of the UAAP's Final Four playoffs format era.

In 2016, after a heart breaking loss the previous season without Ara Galang in the finals, they finished with an 11–3 win-loss elimination record,  starting strong in the elimination round and even ending the Ateneo Lady Eagles’ 24-match winning streak. DLSU then got the number 2 spot entering the Final Four with a twice-to-beat-advantage, but lost to the FEU Lady Tamaraws in game 1 (a 5-set thriller). The Lady Spikers regained their composure as they won in 3 straight sets in Game 2 to advance to the finals facing rival Ateneo Lady Eagles for the 5th consecutive year. In Game 1 of the best of 3 Finals, the Ateneo Lady Eagles started strong and led early but the Lady Spikers regained their bearings and finished to win Game 1 in 3 straight. In Game 2, the Katipunan-based squad rallied from a 0–2 deficit to win in 5 sets with the help of their leading scorer Alyssa Valdez with 34 points. In Game 3, the Lady Spikers, powered by  Best Setter Kim Fajardo together with graduating seniors Ara Galang, Mika Reyes, Cyd Demecillo, Mika Esperanza and Carol Cerveza, and juniors Kim Dy, best blocker Majoy Baron and best digger and best receiver Dawn Macandili, dethroned the Ateneo Lady Eagles, 3 sets to 1, to win their ninth UAAP championship. Kianna Dy was selected as Finals MVP.

In 2017, the Lady Spikers finished with an 11–3 win-loss elimination record gaining a twice to beat advantage in the Final Four Series. The Lady Spikers faced the Lady Tigresses and won in four sets bringing them to another finals appearance against arch rival ADMU Lady Eagles. The Lady Spikers were able to sweep the Best of Three Finals Series winning in four sets in Game 1 and five sets in Game 2, making them back-to-back champions. Kim Fajardo was awarded UAAP Season 79 Best Setter and Best Server, Dawn Macandili was awarded with UAAP Season 79 Best Receiver and Majoy Baron as UAAP Season 79 MVP. Desiree Cheng was named the Finals MVP. In 2018, the Lady Spikers achieved their third 3-peat after sweeping FEU in the Finals. Dawn Macandili was awarded the Finals MVP.

In the girls' division, the Junior Lady Spikers represented by De La Salle-Zobel, have won a league best ten (10) titles which include a 5-peat from UAAP Seasons 57 to 61 and a 3-peat from Seasons 73 to 75. Junior Lady Spiker stalwarts Kim Kianna Dy and Juniors MVP Andie Narciso matched the 3-peat feat of their senior counterparts. In UAAP Season 81, the Junior Lady Spikers won their 10th championship and ended NU's four-year reign.

Record

University Athletic Association of the Philippines
The DLSU Women's Volleyball Team was formed in 1975 when the women's volleyball tournament was introduced in NCAA Season 51, then later moved to the UAAP in 1986 (Season 49) when De La Salle University was admitted into the league.

Shakey's Super League Collegiate Pre-Season Championship

Roster

Notable players

 Aby Maraño
 Angel Canino
 Ara Galang
 Cha Cruz-Behag
 Cyd Demecillo
 Dawn Macandili
 Desiree Cheng
 Ernestine Tiamzon
 Kim Fajardo
 Kim Kianna Dy
 Majoy Baron
 May Luna
 Melissa Gohing-Nacino
 Michele Gumabao
 Mika Reyes
 Monika Sta. Maria

See also

 De La Salle University
 De La Salle Green Archers
 Ateneo–La Salle rivalry
 La Salle–UST rivalry
 De La Salle University Women's Volleyball Team

References

University Athletic Association of the Philippines women's volleyball teams